The Women's Balcony is a 2016 Israeli comedy film directed by Emil Ben-Shimon.

Plot
An orthodox congregation in Jerusalem is celebrating a Bar Mitzvah when a section of the synagogue's balcony, where the women sit, collapses. The rabbi's wife is badly injured and in a coma. The elder rabbi, unable to cope with his wife's condition, cannot function and is cared for by Zion. Rebuilding, with all the funding, permits and inspections is too much for the leaderless congregation. Congregants meeting in a schoolroom for morning prayers, are short of a quorum of ten men (a minyan) and stop a man in Hasidic garb passing down the street who agree to join them. He is Rabbi David, a teacher, and he brings some of his students who more than meet the minyan requirement.

Hearing their story, Rabbi David takes charge and gets the synagogue repaired, but does not complete the woman balcony, claiming a lack of funds. Trying to get the congregation to be more strict in their observance, Rabbi David tells the men to get their wives to cover their heads and suggests they buy their wives nice head scarves as a gift.  The women mostly refuse. Angered at the lack of a place for them in the synagogue, the women, led by Etti, Zion's wife, raise money sufficient to pay for the reconstruction and deposit it in the synagogue’ bank account, but Rabbi David refuses to allow rebuilding, saying the congregation's Torah scroll, which was destroyed in the collapse, must first be replaced. Meanwhile, Rabbi David's assistant is discretely courting Etti's niece.

The women leave their husbands saying they won't return until the balcony is built and later picket Rabbi David's school. The synagogue's treasurer who must countersign any construction check has been avoiding the rabbi so he can't be pressured into signing. Rabbi David visits the old rabbi and tries to convince him that demanding a new Torah scroll be written before completing the balcony is justified under Jewish law, but the old rabbi is still in shock and can't respond.  Unable to find the treasurer, a determined Rabbi David forges a second signature and gives the check to his assistant to cash in order to pay a scribe to write the new scroll. He further tells the assistant that he knows about the girl and forbids the relationship. He also gives the assistant legal notices, demanding they end their protest, to hand out to the picketing women. As Rabbi David watches from his office window, the assistant does so, seeming to ignore the niece, but she soon realizes that instead of a notice, he has handed her the check, thereby allowing the balcony reconstruction to begin. Meanwhile, the old rabbi asks to see his wife in the hospital, finally coming to terms with what has happened. The film ends with the young couple's joyous wedding, with the old rabbi in attendance, and Rabbi David being flagged down by another congregation that is seeking a minyan.

Cast 
 Evelin Hagoel as Etti
 Yigal Naor as Zion
 Orna Banai as Tikva
  as Margalit
 Sharon Elimelech as Ora
 Aviv Alush as Rabbi David
 Itzik Cohen as Aaron
 Herzl Tobey as Nissan
 Haim Znati as Rahamim

References

External links 
 
 
 
 

2016 comedy films
Israeli comedy films
Films about Orthodox and Hasidic Jews
2010s Hebrew-language films